Jerry C. Janes (April 1, 1935 – August 11, 2017) was a Canadian football player who played for the BC Lions, Calgary Stampeders and Hamilton Tiger-Cats. He played college football at Louisiana State University and was drafted in the 1957 NFL draft by the Chicago Bears (Round 21, #252). He died in Surrey, British Columbia in 2017.

References

1935 births
2017 deaths
Hamilton Tiger-Cats players
People from Mooringsport, Louisiana